Go Myeong-seok (Korean: 고명석; born 27 September 1995) is a South Korean professional footballer who plays as a defender for Suwon Samsung Bluewings.

Career
For the 2018 season, Go signed for South Korean second division side Daejeon Hana Citizen due to their head coach, South Korea international Ko Jong-soo.

Before the 2019 season, he signed for Suwon Samsung Bluewings in the South Korean top flight.

References

External links
 

Living people
1995 births
South Korean footballers
Association football defenders
Bucheon FC 1995 players
Daejeon Hana Citizen FC players
Suwon Samsung Bluewings players
Gimcheon Sangmu FC players
K League 1 players
K League 2 players
Footballers from Seoul